Martin George Guisse, born Martin George Guise (12 March 1780 – 23 November 1828), and later known as Jorge Martín Guisse in Spanish, was a British naval officer who served in Royal Navy in the French Revolutionary and Napoleonic Wars.  He later served in the Chilean Navy during the Peruvian War of Independence and, as Vice-Admiral, in the Peruvian Navy in the Gran Colombia–Peru War, during which he was killed.

Biography
He was a younger son of Sir John Guise, 1st Baronet, of Elmore Court, Gloucester, and Elizabeth Wright, and joined the Royal Navy, receiving a commission as a lieutenant on 6 March 1801, and taking part in the Battle of Trafalgar in October 1805. He commanded the 14-gun brig  between 1811 and 1813, which captured the American ship Freeman on 29 July 1812. Guisse was promoted to commander 29 March 1815.

When Guisse heard of the South American wars of independence he resigned from the Navy, bought his own ship, HMS , and set sail never to return to Britain. He arrived in Buenos Aires and quickly came to an agreement with  Lord Cochrane to join the Chilean Navy. Guisse's role in the battles that followed was significant, in spite of frequent, bitter disagreements with Cochrane. It was his contribution to the attack on the Spanish Esmeralda in Callao that made its capture possible.

After the war and in poor health, he retired to Miraflores, Lima where he married the young Limenian, Juana Valle Riestra. But his civilian life was short. When Gran Colombia–Peru War broke out in 1829, he was asked to take command of the Peruvian Navy. Appointed Vice-Admiral, his fleet captured Guayaquil but he was killed by a sniper during the battle.

His body was brought to Callao in honour and he was buried there in the clothes of a Franciscan friar. In 1926 his remains were transferred to the Panteón de los Próceres.

One of the four houses of Markham College, Lima, is named in his honour, as is Liceo Naval Almirante Guisse, a school founded in 1964 for the children of Peruvian naval officers.

Guisse was the grandfather of Peruvian aviator George Chavez.

See also
 Guise baronets

Notes

References

1780 births
1829 deaths
Royal Navy personnel of the Napoleonic Wars
British emigrants to Peru
Peruvian Navy admirals
Military personnel killed in action
People of the Peruvian War of Independence
People of the Chilean War of Independence